Prisogaster elevatus is a species of sea snail, a marine gastropod mollusk in the family Turbinidae, the turban snails.

Description
The height of the shell attains 13 mm, its diameter 12 mm. "The imperforate shell has an ovate-conic shape.  Its color is ashy-black. The acute spire is elevated. The five whorls are convex, slightly excavated at the sutures. They are nearly smooth and obsoletely spirally lirate. The large body whorl is convex below. The ovate aperture is silvery within. The lip is black. The planate columella has a depressed-concave shape and is not produced at its base."

"The ovate operculum is yellowish inside. It contains two to three whorls and a sublateral nucleus. The outer surface is convex, white, rugose and subumbilicate."

Distribution
This species occurs in the Pacific Ocean off Chile.

References

In: Eydoux J. F. T. & Souleyet F. L. A. 1841-1852, Voyage autour du Monde executé pendant les années 1836 et 1837 sur la corvette "La Bonite", commandée par M. Vaillant, Capitaine de vaisseau, publié par ordre du Roi sous les auspices du Département de la Marine., p. 664 pp

External links
  Eydoux, J. F. T. & Souleyet, L. F. A. (1852). Voyage autour du monde exécuté pendant les années 1836 et 1837 sur la corvette La Bonite commandée par M. Vaillant. Zoologie, Tome Deuxième. Zoologie. Bertrand, Paris. 664 pp., Paris (Arthus Bertrand)

elevatus
Gastropods described in 1852
Endemic fauna of Chile